The McTickles was a British gag-a-day comic strip in the British comic book magazine The Beano. It was drawn by Vic Neill and ran from 1971 to 1974.

Concept

Chief Jock and his highland clan fought a comic war of attrition against their rivals the McNasties, while avoiding the pranks played on them by the "McHaggises", small round animals with a similar shape to a haggis and with long noses and thistles for ears. Some McHaggises had legs of different length on opposite sides of their bodies, allowing them to remain horizontal while walking around the sides of mountains. The many types of 'McHaggises' included the Spiky Hedgehoggis, the Fiery McHaggis, the Roller McHaggis, and many others  (This is in fact a common joke used by Scottish people when "explaining" the haggis to uninitiated visitors.) Another recurring comic device was to prefix "Mc" to important words and onomatopoeia. For example, if someone fired a gun, the sound would be written "McBang".The leader of The McTickles was named Chief Jock and the other Mctickles were Morag (Stroppy middle-aged woman), Murdo who had a long beard, Nickol who was one of the younger clan members, Donald who is also one of the younger clan members and some others who were never named.

History

After four years the strip was replaced by another Scottish-highland themed strip, Wee Ben Nevis, also drawn by Neill.

Beano strips
1971 comics debuts
Comics characters introduced in 1971
1974 comics endings
Fictional families
Fictional Scottish people
British comics characters
Gag-a-day comics
Comics set in Scotland